

Nygaardsvold's Cabinet (later becoming the Norwegian government-in-exile, Norwegian: Norsk eksilregjering) was appointed on 20 March 1935, the second Labour cabinet in Norway. It brought to an end the non-socialist minority Governments that had been dominating politics since the introduction of the parliamentary system in 1884, and replaced it with stable Labour Governments that, with the exception of during World War II, would last until the coalition cabinet Lyng in 1963.

Since the cabinet Hornsrud intermezzo in the winter of 1928, a one-month Labour Government, the Labour Party had changed from revolutionary communism to social democracy. The main reason for the change of course was the realization that Government power could be used for reforms that could lessen the impact of the economic crisis. In the 1933 election the party used the slogans "Work for everyone" and "Country and city, hand in hand". The last time the party portrayed itself as revolutionary was the 1930 election.

The Labour Party advanced in the 1933 election, but did not get a majority. Instead they made a compromise with the Farmer Party, allowing the cabinet Nygaardsvold to enter the Council of State. The party did not get majority in the 1936 election either, and continued to govern thanks to fluctuating support from various opposition parties.

The night before 9 April 1940, the Norwegian Government was, like most other authorities in the country, surprised by the German Operation Weserübung. It chose resistance, though in a rather fumbling and unclear way, especially initially. The Government left Norway on 7 June 1940 after the capitulation and established itself in London the same day, along with King Haakon VII and Crown Prince Olav.

Back in Norway, over the course of the war, four cabinets were instated by Vidkun Quisling and Josef Terboven, as the de facto Governments of Norway. The Government-in-exile is sometimes referred to as the London Cabinet. It returned to Norway on 31 May 1945
aboard the UK troop ship . On 12 June, Nygaardsvold announced his resignation, and on 25 June, the pan-political first cabinet Gerhardsen took over.

Below are the four de facto Governments in Oslo during the war, either sympathising with or actually appointed by German Forces. The Reichskommissar in Oslo was Josef Terboven.

 First cabinet Quisling (1940)
 Cabinet Christiansen (1940)
 Cabinet Terboven (1940–42)
 Second cabinet Quisling (1942–45)

Cabinet Nygaardsvold

See also
 Norwegian Armed Forces in exile

References

Further reading
 

Cabinet of Norway
Governments in exile during World War II
1935 establishments in Norway
1940 establishments in England
1945 disestablishments in England
1945 disestablishments in Norway
1940s in the City of Westminster
Norway–United Kingdom relations
Cabinets established in 1935
Cabinets disestablished in 1945
Gerhardsen 3
Former governments in exile